The Federico Tesio Stakes is an American Thoroughbred horse race held annually at Laurel Park in Laurel, Maryland over a distance of  miles on the dirt for three-year-old horses.

Run during the latter part of April/early May, the race can be a stepping stone to the second leg of the U.S. Triple Crown series, the Preakness Stakes. Local patrons refer to the Tesio Stakes as the "Preakness Trial." Since 2016, it has been a "Win and You're In" qualifier for the Preakness.

History
The race was named in honor of famous Italian breeder Federico Tesio, owner of Dormello Stud in Dormelletto, Novara. Tesio was one of the most important breeders of Thoroughbreds in the history of horse racing. His homebreds Nearco and Ribot, both great sires, dominate Thoroughbred bloodlines throughout the world. Tesio died in 1954 at age 85.

The last horse to win this race and the Preakness was Deputed Testamony in 1983. Several Tesio runners have made a major impact on the Triple Crown by placing in the Preakness during the last twenty years, including Icabad Crane in 2008, Magic Weisner in 2002, Oliver's Twist in 1995, and Rock Point in 1989 and Broad Brush in 1986. In 2011, Tesio runner-up Ruler On Ice won the Belmont Stakes and in 1998 Tesio winner Thomas Jo placed third in the Belmont Stakes.

The Federico Tesio Stakes was an American Grade III stakes race from 1986 through 1997. The race was restricted to Maryland breeds from 1981 through 1985. It was run at  miles from 1981 to 1991 and from 2011 to 2015.

Prior to 2016, the race was held at Pimlico Race Course in Baltimore, Maryland. It was run at Pimlico again in 2021 following an emergency shift of racing dates from Laurel Park.

Records 

Speed record: 
  miles - 1:49.00 - Marciano (2001)
  miles - 1:42.60 - Sparrowvon (1985)

Most wins by an owner:
 2 - Earle I. Mack    (1998 & 2008)

Most wins by a jockey:
 3 - Ryan Fogelsonger    (2003, 2004 & 2006)

Most wins by a trainer:
 2 - King T. Leatherbury    (2005 & 2006)
 2 - J. William Boniface    (1983 & 1995)

Winners of the Federico Tesio Stakes 

1Excellorator finished first, but was disqualified and placed second for interference.

See also 
 Federico Tesio Stakes top three finishers
 Pimlico Race Course
 List of graded stakes at Pimlico Race Course

References 

 The Federico Tesio Stakes at Pedigree Query
 The 2007 Federico Tesio Stakes at Thoroughbred Times 

Previously graded stakes races in the United States
1981 establishments in Maryland
Flat horse races for three-year-olds
Triple Crown Prep Races
Pimlico Race Course
Horse races in Maryland
Recurring sporting events established in 1981